Live from Nowhere in Particular is the third live album by American blues rock musician Joe Bonamassa. Produced by Kevin Shirley, it was released on August 19, 2008 by J&R Adventures and topped the US Billboard Top Blues Albums chart.

Track listing

Chart performance

Personnel

Musical performers
Joe Bonamassa – guitar, vocals
Carmine Rojas – bass
Bogie Bowles – drums
Rick Melick – keyboards

Production personnel
Jay Phebus – recording
Kevin Shirley – production, mixing
Justin Pintar – mixing assistance
Ryan Smith – mastering

Additional personnel
Dennis Friel – graphic design
Ross Halfin – photography

References

2008 live albums
Joe Bonamassa albums
Albums produced by Kevin Shirley